2022 is the 1st year in the history of the Eagle Fighting Championship, a mixed martial arts promotion based in Miami, Florida. 2022 began with Eagle FC 44.

Background
Khabib Nurmagomedov announced that Eagle Fighting Championship has plans for United States expansion in 2022. The organization plans to hold as many as 10 events in the USA.

List of events

Title fight

Eagle FC 44: Spong vs. Kharitonov

Eagle Fighting Championship 44: Spong vs. Kharitonov was a mixed martial arts event held by Eagle Fighting Championship on January 28, 2022, in Miami, Florida, USA.

Background
The main event was initially set to feature the former It's Showtime champion Tyrone Spong and UFC veteran Antônio Silva, but Silva was forced off the card on December 13 due to undisclosed reasons. Instead, the event was headlined by a heavyweight bout between Spong and Sergei Kharitonov, who stepped in for Silva.

Former UFC Bantamweight champion Renan Barão was scheduled to face Horacio Gutiérrez at this event, but the bout was cancelled.

Results

|-

Eagle FC: Selecton 4

Eagle FC: Selecton 4 was a mixed martial arts event held by Eagle Fighting Championship on January 29, 2022, in Kizilyurt, Russia.

Results

Eagle FC 45: Gitinovasov vs. Magomedov

Eagle FC 45: Gitinovasov vs. Magomedov was a mixed martial arts event held by Eagle Fighting Championship on February 18, 2022, in Moscow, Russia.

Background

Results

Eagle FC 46: Lee vs. Sanchez

Eagle Fighting Championship 46: Lee vs. Sanchez was a mixed martial arts event held by Eagle Fighting Championship on March 11, 2022, in Miami, Florida, USA.

Background
The main event featured Diego Sanchez and Kevin Lee in their Eagle FC debuts in a 165 pounds bout.

At weigh ins, Impa Kasanganay and Ikram Aliskerov missed weight for their respective bouts. Kasanganay weighed in at 179.2 pounds, 3.2 pounds over the welterweight non-title limit. Aliskerov weighed in at 186.2 pounds, 0.2 pounds over the middleweight non-title limit. Both of their bouts proceeded at catchweight and they were each fined a percentage of their individual purses respectively, which went to their opponents.

Results

Eagle FC 47: Dos Santos vs. De Castro

Eagle Fighting Championship 47: Dos Santos vs. De Castro was a mixed martial arts event held by Eagle Fighting Championship on May 20, 2022, in Miami, Florida, USA .

Background
In the main event, the show featured the debut of former UFC heavyweight champion Junior Dos Santos as he faced fellow UFC veteran Yorgan De Castro. 

The co-main event featured the debut of former Bellator MMA middleweight champion and UFC contender Héctor Lombard against fellow UFC alum Thiago Silva, who returned after a three-year absence from mixed martial arts competition. 

At weigh ins, Maki Pitolo, Doug Usher, Alexandre Almeida, and Paulo Silva missed weight for their respective bouts. Pitolo weighed in at 187.4 pounds, Usher weighed in at 189 pounds, Alexandre Almeida weighed in at 158.4 pounds, and Paulo Silva weighed in at 156.6 pounds.

Results

Eagle FC 48 & Naiza FC 41

Eagle Fighting Championship 48 & Naiza FC 41 was a mixed martial arts event held by Eagle Fighting Championship & Naiza Fighting Championship on July 16, 2022, in Aktau, Kazakhstan.

Results

Eagle FC 49: Busurmankul vs. Magomedov

Eagle Fighting Championship 49: Busurmankul vs. Magomedov was a mixed martial arts event held by Eagle Fighting Championship on August 10, 2022, in Bishkek, Kyrgyzstan.

Fight card

Eagle FC 50: Nurgozhay vs. Andreitsev

Eagle Fighting Championship 50: Nurgozhay vs. Andreitsev was a mixed martial arts event held by Eagle Fighting Championship on August 21, 2022, in Nur-Sultan, Kazakhstan.

Fight card

Eagle FC: Selection 5 Cup of Minin

Eagle FC: Selection 5 Cup of Minin was a mixed martial arts event held by Eagle Fighting Championship on October 30, 2022, in Nizhny Novgorod, Russia.

Results

Eagle FC: Selection 6

Eagle FC: Selection 6 was a mixed martial arts event held by Eagle Fighting Championship on December 2, 2022 in Almetyevsk, Russia.

Results

Eagle FC 51: Izmodenov vs. Mukhtarov

Eagle FC 51: Izmodenov vs. Mukhtarov was a mixed martial arts event held by Eagle Fighting Championship on December 10, 2022 in Atyrau, Kazakhstan.

Fight card

See also
 2022 in UFC
 2022 in Bellator MMA
 2022 in ONE Championship
 2022 in Absolute Championship Akhmat
 2022 in Konfrontacja Sztuk Walki
 2022 in Rizin Fighting Federation
 2022 in AMC Fight Nights 
 2022 in Brave Combat Federation
 2022 in Road FC
 2022 Professional Fighters League season
 2022 in Legacy Fighting Alliance

References

External links
Eagle FC

2022 in mixed martial arts
Eagle FC events
2022 sport-related lists